Belogorki is a rural locality (a selo) in Belogorskoye Rural Settlement, Kamyshinsky District, Volgograd Oblast, Russia. The population was 192 as of 2010. There are 5 streets.

Geography 
Belogorki is located on the Volga Upland, 27 km southwest of Kamyshin (the district's administrative centre) by road. Gosselekstantsiya is the nearest rural locality.

References 

Rural localities in Kamyshinsky District